The 2017–18 San Antonio Spurs season was the 51st season for the franchise, the team's 42nd season in the National Basketball Association (NBA), and its 45th in the San Antonio area. The Spurs finished the season with a 47–35 record and the seventh seed in the Western Conference. In the first round of the playoffs, the team was defeated in five games by the defending champion and eventual NBA champion Golden State Warriors, the team that swept them in last season's Western Conference Finals. The 2017–18 season was the final season that Tony Parker and Manu Ginóbili played for the team, and Kawhi Leonard and Danny Green would be traded following the season to the Toronto Raptors.

Season synopsis
Star forward Kawhi Leonard played a career-low nine games during the season due to a quadriceps injury. On March 10, 2018, the Spurs finished with a losing season on the road for the first time since 1997 after a loss to the Oklahoma City Thunder. However, the team finished the season with a winning record, doing so for an NBA-record 21st consecutive season. With a loss to the Los Angeles Clippers on April 3, 2018, the Spurs' streak of 18 straight seasons of 50 wins or more (and 20 straight seasons with a winning percentage of .600 or better) ended; it had lasted since the 1997–98 season. The Spurs clinched a playoff spot on April 9, 2018 with a win over the Sacramento Kings in their last home game of the season. They finished the regular season with a 47–35 record and held the seventh seed in the Western Conference.

In the first round of the playoffs, the Spurs faced the second-seeded Golden State Warriors and lost in five games.

Draft

Roster

Standings

Division

Conference

Game log

Preseason 

|- style="background:#fcc;"
| 1
| October 2
| @ Sacramento
| 
| LaMarcus Aldridge (17)
| Davis Bertans (6)
| Gasol, Ginobili, Mills (3)
| Golden 1 Center16,000
| 0–1
|- style="background:#bfb;"
| 2
| October 6
| Sacramento
| 
| Danny Green (20)
| Joffrey Lauvergne (10)
| Patty Mills (6)
| AT&T Center18,082
| 1–1
|- style="background:#bfb;"
| 3
| October 8
| Denver
| 
| LaMarcus Aldridge (21)
| Matt Costello (12)
| LaMarcus Aldridge (6)
| AT&T Center17,832
| 2–1
|- style="background:#fcc;"
| 4
| October 10
| Orlando
| 
| LaMarcus Aldridge (16)
| Gasol, Gay, Lauvergne (7)
| Dejounte Murray (5)
| AT&T Center17,671
| 2–2
|- style="background:#bfb;"
| 5
| October 13
| @ Houston
| 
| LaMarcus Aldridge (26)
| LaMarcus Aldridge (10)
| Danny Green (7)
| Toyota Center17,445
| 3–2

Regular season 

|- style="background:#bfb;"
| 1
| October 18
| Minnesota
| 
| LaMarcus Aldridge (25)
| LaMarcus Aldridge (10)
| Aldridge, Gasol, Ginobili (4)
| AT&T Center18,418
| 1–0
|- style="background:#bfb;"
| 2
| October 21
| @ Chicago
| 
| LaMarcus Aldridge (28)
| Aldridge, Murray (10)
| Dejounte Murray (6)
| United Center21,640
| 2–0
|- style="background:#bfb;"
| 3
| October 23
| Toronto
| 
| LaMarcus Aldridge (20)
| Dejounte Murray (14)
| Dejounte Murray (6)
| AT&T Center18,418
| 3–0
|- style="background:#bfb;"
| 4
| October 25
| @ Miami
| 
| LaMarcus Aldridge (31)
| Kyle Anderson (10)
| Gay, Mills (4)
| American Airlines Arena19,600
| 4–0
|- style="background:#fbb;"
| 5
| October 27
| @ Orlando
| 
| LaMarcus Aldridge (24)
| Aldridge, Gasol (11)
| Anderson, Gay, Murray (10)
| Amway Center17,337
| 4–1
|- style="background:#fbb;"
| 6
| October 29
| @ Indiana
| 
| LaMarcus Aldridge (26)
| Aldridge, Anderson (8)
| Gasol, Ginobili (5)
| Bankers Life Fieldhouse15,013
| 4–2
|- style="background:#fbb;"
| 7
| October 30
| @ Boston
| 
| Brandon Paul (18)
| Pau Gasol (8)
| Gasol, Mills, Murray (4)
| TD Garden18,624
| 4–3

|- style="background:#fbb;"
| 8
| November 2
| Golden State
| 
| LaMarcus Aldridge (24)
| LaMarcus Aldridge (10)
| Anderson, Green (4)
| AT&T Center18,418
| 4–4
|- style="background:#bfb;"
| 9
| November 3
| Charlotte
| 
| Bryn Forbes  (22)
| Pau Gasol (10)
| Pau Gasol (7)
| AT&T Center18,418
| 5–4
|- style="background:#bfb;"
| 10
| November 5
| Phoenix
| 
| LaMarcus Aldridge (21)
| Aldridge, Gasol (9)
| Patty Mills (4)
| AT&T Center18,038
| 6–4
|- style="background:#bfb;"
| 11
| November 7
| L.A. Clippers
| 
| LaMarcus Aldridge (25)
| Pau Gasol (8)
| Gasol, Mills (6)
| AT&T Center18,418
| 7–4
|- style="background:#fbb;"
| 12
| November 10
| Milwaukee
| 
| LaMarcus Aldridge (20)
| LaMarcus Aldridge (12)
| Pau Gasol (5)
| AT&T Center18,418
| 7–5
|- style="background:#bfb;"
| 13
| November 11
| Chicago
| 
| Pau Gasol (21)
| Pau Gasol (10)
| Patty Mills (6)
| AT&T Center18,418
| 8–5
|- style="background:#bfb;"
| 14
| November 14
| @ Dallas
| 
| LaMarcus Aldridge (25)
| Pau Gasol (10)
| Aldridge, Gasol (4)
| American Airlines Center19,535
| 9–5
|- style="background:#fbb;"
| 15
| November 15
| @ Minnesota
| 
| LaMarcus Aldridge (15)
| LaMarcus Aldridge (10)
| Patty Mills (5)
| Target Center18,978
| 9–6
|- style="background:#bfb;"
| 16
| November 17
| Oklahoma City
| 
| LaMarcus Aldridge (26)
| LaMarcus Aldridge (9)
| Kyle Anderson (6)
| AT&T Center18,418
| 10–6
|- style="background:#bfb;"
| 17
| November 20
| Atlanta
| 
| LaMarcus Aldridge (22)
| LaMarcus Aldridge (11)
| Kyle Anderson (10)
| AT&T Center18,418
| 11–6
|- style="background:#fbb;"
| 18
| November 22
| @ New Orleans
| 
| Rudy Gay (19)
| Pau Gasol (9)
| Anderson, Danny Green, Murray (4)
| Smoothie King Center17,539
| 11–7
|- style="background:#bfb;"
| 19
| November 25
| @ Charlotte
| 
| Aldridge, Gasol (17)
| Aldridge, Gasol, Danny Green (7)
| Aldridge, Gay (4)
| Spectrum Center18,597
| 12–7
|- style="background:#bfb;"
| 20
| November 27
| Dallas
| 
| LaMarcus Aldridge (33)
| Aldridge, Gasol (10)
| Anderson, Green, Mills (5)
| AT&T Center17,918
| 13–7
|- style="background:#bfb;"
| 21
| November 29
| Memphis
| 
| LaMarcus Aldridge (33)
| Aldridge, Gasol (6)
| Mills, Parker (5)
| AT&T Center18,013
| 14–7

|- style="background:#bfb;"
| 22
| December 1
| @ Memphis
| 
| LaMarcus Aldridge (22)
| Pau Gasol (8)
| Manu Ginobili (6)
| FedExForum16,413
| 15–7
|- style="background:#fbb;"
| 23
| December 3
| @ Oklahoma City
| 
| Dejounte Murray (17)
| Dejounte Murray (11)
| Dejounte Murray (5)
| Chesapeake Energy Arena18,203
| 15–8
|- style="background:#bfb;"
| 24
| December 4
| Detroit
| 
| LaMarcus Aldridge (17)
| Aldridge, Gasol, Gay (10)
| Aldridge, Gasol, Gay (4)
| AT&T Center18,288
| 16–8
|- style="background:#bfb;"
| 25
| December 6
| Miami
| 
| LaMarcus Aldridge (18)
| Pau Gasol (7)
| Tony Parker (9)
| AT&T Center18,252
| 17–8
|- style="background:#bfb;"
| 26
| December 8
| Boston
| 
| LaMarcus Aldridge (27)
| Pau Gasol (11)
| Mills, Parker (4)
| AT&T Center18,418
| 18–8
|- style="background:#bfb;"
| 27
| December 9
| @ Phoenix
| 
| Aldridge, Mills (20)
| Dejounte Murray (14)
| Dejounte Murray (4)
| Talking Stick Resort Arena16,575
| 19–8
|- style="background:#fbb;"
| 28
| December 12
| @ Dallas
| 
| LaMarcus Aldridge (23)
| LaMarcus Aldridge (13)
| Bryn Forbes (4)
| American Airlines Center19,874
| 19–9
|- style="background:#fbb;"
| 29
| December 15
| @ Houston
| 
| LaMarcus Aldridge (16)
| Rudy Gay (8)
| Dejounte Murray (5)
| Toyota Center18,055
| 19–10
|- style="background:#bfb;"
| 30
| December 16
| Dallas
| 
| LaMarcus Aldridge (22)
| LaMarcus Aldridge (14)
| Dejounte Murray (4)
| AT&T Center18,418
| 20–10
|- style="background:#bfb;"
| 31
| December 18
| L.A. Clippers
| 
| LaMarcus Aldridge (19)
| Pau Gasol (12)
| Tony Parker (7)
| AT&T Center18,418
| 21–10
|- style="background:#bfb;"
| 32
| December 20
| @ Portland
| 
| LaMarcus Aldridge (22)
| Pau Gasol (17)
| Pau Gasol (6)
| Moda Center19,393
| 22–10
|- style="background:#fbb;"
| 33
| December 21
| @ Utah
| 
| Bryn Forbes (12)
| Dejounte Murray (8)
| Tony Parker (6)
| Vivint Smart Home Arena18,306
| 22–11
|- style="background:#bfb;"
| 34
| December 23
| @ Sacramento
| 
| LaMarcus Aldridge (29)
| Pau Gasol (11)
| Pau Gasol (10)
| Golden 1 Center17,583
| 23–11
|- style="background:#bfb;"
| 35
| December 26
| Brooklyn
| 
| Kawhi Leonard (21)
| Pau Gasol (12)
| Pau Gasol (5)
| AT&T Center18,492
| 24–11
|- style="background:#bfb;"
| 36
| December 28
| New York
| 
| LaMarcus Aldridge (25)
| Pau Gasol (11)
| Pau Gasol (7)
| AT&T Center18,935
| 25–11
|- style="background:#fbb;"
| 37
| December 30
| @ Detroit
| 
| Kawhi Leonard (18)
| LaMarcus Aldridge (11)
| Patty Mills (4)
| Little Caesars Arena19,671
| 25–12

|- style="background:#bfb;"
| 38
| January 2
| @ New York
| 
| LaMarcus Aldridge (29)
| Leonard, Murray, Gasol (8)
| Kawhi Leonard (4)
| Madison Square Garden19,812
| 26–12
|- style="background:#fbb;"
| 39
| January 3
| @ Philadelphia
| 
| Patty Mills (26)
| LaMarcus Aldridge (14)
| Pau Gasol (4)
| Wells Fargo Center20,642
| 26–13
|- style="background:#bfb;"
| 40
| January 5
| Phoenix
| 
| Ginobili, Leonard (21)
| Bertans, Gasol (7)
| Tony Parker (7)
| AT&T Center18,501
| 27–13
|- style="background:#fbb;"
| 41
| January 7
| @ Portland
| 
| LaMarcus Aldridge (30)
| LaMarcus Aldridge (14)
| Anderson, Gasol (5)
| Moda Center19,393
| 27–14
|- style="background:#bfb;"
| 42
| January 8
| @ Sacramento
| 
| LaMarcus Aldridge (31)
| LaMarcus Aldridge (12)
| Dejounte Murray (6)
| Golden 1 Center17,583
| 28–14
|- style="background:#fbb;"
| 43
| January 11
| @ L.A. Lakers
| 
| LaMarcus Aldridge (20)
| Pau Gasol (12)
| Gasol, Murray (5)
| Staples Center18,997
| 28–15
|- style="background:#bfb;"
| 44
| January 13
| Denver
| 
| Kawhi Leonard (19)
| Kawhi Leonard (8)
| Tony Parker (5)
| AT&T Center18,418
| 29–15
|- style="background:#fbb;"
| 45
| January 15
| @ Atlanta
| 
| LaMarcus Aldridge (25)
| LaMarcus Aldridge (11)
| Gasol, Parker (4)
| Philips Arena15,806
| 29–16
|- style="background:#bfb;"
| 46
| January 17
| @ Brooklyn
| 
| LaMarcus Aldridge (34)
| Pau Gasol (12)
| Pau Gasol (7)
| Barclays Center15,425
| 30–16
|- style="background:#fbb;"
| 47
| January 19
| @ Toronto
| 
| LaMarcus Aldridge (17)
| LaMarcus Aldridge (14)
| Tony Parker (4)
| Air Canada Centre19,800
| 30–17
|- style="background:#fbb;"
| 48
| January 21
| Indiana
| 
| Pau Gasol (14)
| LaMarcus Aldridge (10)
| Tony Parker (5)
| AT&T Center18,418
| 30–18
|- style="background:#bfb;"
| 49
| January 23
| Cleveland
| 
| LaMarcus Aldridge (30)
| Kyle Anderson (12)
| Tony Parker (6)
| AT&T Center18,418
| 31–18
|- style="background:#bfb;"
| 50
| January 24
| @ Memphis
| 
| Patty Mills (15)
| Pau Gasol (15)
| Pau Gasol (9)
| FedExForum15,812
| 32–18
|- style="background:#fbb;"
| 51
| January 26
| Philadelphia
| 
| LaMarcus Aldridge (18)
| Dejounte Murray (9)
| Dejounte Murray (5)
| AT&T Center18,418
| 32–19
|- style="background:#bfb;"
| 52
| January 28
| Sacramento
| 
| Bryn Forbes (23)
| Pau Gasol (11)
| Dejounte Murray (6)
| AT&T Center18,418
| 33–19
|- style="background:#bfb;"
| 53
| January 30
| Denver
| 
| LaMarcus Aldridge (30)
| Dejounte Murray (13)
| Dejounte Murray (7)
| AT&T Center18,418
| 34–19

|- style="background:#fbb;"
| 54
| February 1
| Houston
| 
| Danny Green (22)
| Dejounte Murray (11)
| Aldridge, Ginobili, Green, Murray (22)
| AT&T Center18,418
| 34–20
|- style="background:#fbb;"
| 55
| February 3
| Utah
| 
| LaMarcus Aldridge (31)
| Pau Gasol (11)
| Tony Parker (9)
| AT&T Center18,418
| 34–21
|- style="background:#bfb;"
| 56
| February 7
| @ Phoenix
| 
| LaMarcus Aldridge (23)
| LaMarcus Aldridge (13)
| Aldridge, Anderson, Gasol (4)
| Talking Stick Resort Arena15,993
| 35–21
|- style="background:#fbb;"
| 57
| February 10
| @ Golden State
| 
| Aldridge, Anderson (20)
| Derrick White (7)
| Manu Ginobili (6)
| Oracle Arena19,596
| 35–22
|- style="background:#fbb;"
| 58
| February 12
| @ Utah
| 
| Kyle Anderson (16)
| Pau Gasol (15)
| Pau Gasol (6)
| Vivint Smart Home Arena18,306
| 35–23
|- style="background:#fbb;"
| 59
| February 13
| @ Denver
| 
| Joffrey Lauvergne (26)
| Joffrey Lauvergne (12)
| Tony Parker (4)
| Pepsi Center17,623
| 35–24
|- style="text-align:center;"
| colspan="9" style="background:#bbcaff;"|All-Star Break
|- style="background:#fbb;"
| 60
| February 23
| @ Denver
| 
| LaMarcus Aldridge (38)
| Pau Gasol (12)
| Mills, Murray, Parker (5)
| Pepsi Center20,027
| 35–25
|- style="background:#bfb;"
| 61
| February 25
| @ Cleveland
| 
| LaMarcus Aldridge (27)
| Dejounte Murray (9)
| Mills, Murray (5)
| Quicken Loans Arena20,562
| 36–25
|- style="background:#fbb;"
| 62
| February 28
| New Orleans
| 
| Rudy Gay (19)
| Dejounte Murray (9)
| Dejounte Murray (5)
| AT&T Center18,418
| 36–26

|- style="background:#fbb;"
| 63
| March 3
| L.A. Lakers
| 
| Pau Gasol (19)
| Pau Gasol (10)
| Pau Gasol (8)
| AT&T Center18,557
| 36–27
|- style="background:#bfb;"
| 64
| March 5
| Memphis
| 
| Tony Parker (23)
| LaMarcus Aldridge (8)
| Anderson, Gasol, Parker (5)
| AT&T Center18,418
| 37–27
|- style="background:#fbb;"
| 65
| March 8
| @ Golden State
| 
| LaMarcus Aldridge (30)
| LaMarcus Aldridge (17)
| Tony Parker (7)
| Oracle Arena19,596
| 37–28
|- style="background:#fbb;"
| 66
| March 10
| @ Oklahoma City
| 
| Bertans, Gay (14)
| Aldridge, Gasol (7)
| Manu Ginóbili (6)
| Chesapeake Energy Arena18,203
| 37–29
|- style="background:#fbb;"
| 67
| March 12
| @ Houston
| 
| Forbes, White (14)
| Joffrey Lauvergne (6)
| Murray, Forbes, Parker (3) 
| Toyota Center18,092
| 37–30
|- style="background:#bfb;"
| 68
| March 13
| Orlando
| 
| Lamarcus Aldridge (24)
| Dejounte Murray (8)
| Tony Parker (8)
| AT&T Center18,418
| 38–30
|- style="background:#bfb;"
| 69
| March 15
| New Orleans
| 
| Lamarcus Aldridge (25)
| Dejounte Murray (12)
| Anderson, Parker (4)
| AT&T Center18,418
| 39–30
|- style="background:#bfb;"
| 70
| March 17
| Minnesota
| 
| Lamarcus Aldridge (39)
| Lamarcus Aldridge (10)
| Pau Gasol (8)
| AT&T Center18,418
| 40–30
|- style="background:#bfb;"
| 71
| March 19
| Golden State
| 
| Lamarcus Aldridge (33)
| Lamarcus Aldridge (12)
| Dejounte Murray (5)
| AT&T Center18,418
| 41–30
|- style="background:#bfb;"
| 72
| March 21
| Washington
| 
| Lamarcus Aldridge (27)
| Dejounte Murray (10)
| Aldridge, Anderson (4)
| AT&T Center18,418
| 42–30
|- style="background:#bfb;"
| 73
| March 23
| Utah
| 
| Lamarcus Aldridge (45)
| Lamarcus Aldridge (9)
| Dejounte Murray (5)
| AT&T Center18,418
| 43–30
|- style="background:#fbb;"
| 74
| March 25
| @ Milwaukee
| 
| Lamarcus Aldridge (34)
| Pau Gasol (13)
| Ginobili, Murray (3)
| Bradley Center18,717
| 43–31
|- style="background:#fbb;"
| 75
| March 27
| @ Washington
| 
| Lamarcus Aldridge (13)
| Pau Gasol (6)
| Forbes, Mills (6)
| Capital One Arena19,588
| 43–32
|- style="background:#bfb;"
| 76
| March 29
| Oklahoma City
| 
| LaMarcus Aldridge (25)
| Pau Gasol (12)
| Dejounte Murray (7)
| AT&T Center18,418
| 44–32

|- style="background:#bfb;"
| 77
| April 1
| Houston
| 
| LaMarcus Aldridge (23)
| LaMarcus Aldridge (14)
| Kyle Anderson (5)
| AT&T Center18,418
| 45–32
|- style="background:#fbb;"
| 78
| April 3
| @ L.A. Clippers
| 
| Lamarcus Aldridge (35)
| Lamarcus Aldridge (9)
| Patty Mills (5)
| Staples Center17,449
| 45–33
|- style="background:#fbb;"
| 79
| April 4
| @ L.A. Lakers
| 
| Lamarcus Aldridge (28)
| Pau Gasol (12)
| Dejounte Murray (6)
| Staples Center18,997
| 45–34
|- style="background:#bfb;"
| 80
| April 7
| Portland
| 
| Lamarcus Aldridge (28)
| Lamarcus Aldridge (8)
| Patty Mills (6)
| AT&T Center18,610
| 46–34
|- style="background:#bfb;"
| 81
| April 9
| Sacramento
| 
| Rudy Gay (18)
| Lamarcus Aldridge (14)
| Manu Ginobili (5)
| AT&T Center18,418
| 47–34
|- style="background:#fbb;"
| 82
| April 11
| @ New Orleans
| 
| Aldridge, Murray, Parker (11)
| Gasol, Gay (7)
| Gasol, Ginobili (4)
| Smoothie King Center18,573
| 47–35

Playoffs

|- style="background:#fbb;"
| 1
| April 14
| @ Golden State
| 
| Rudy Gay (15)
| Rudy Gay (6)
| Pau Gasol (4)
| Oracle Arena19,596
| 0–1
|- style="background:#fbb;"
| 2
| April 16
| @ Golden State
| 
| LaMarcus Aldridge (34)
| LaMarcus Aldridge (12)
| Aldridge, Gay, Gasol, Ginobili, Mills (3)
| Oracle Arena19,596
| 0–2
|- style="background:#fbb;"
| 3
| April 19
| Golden State
| 
| LaMarcus Aldridge (18)
| LaMarcus Aldridge (10)
| Aldridge, Murray (4)
| AT&T Center18,418
| 0–3
|- style="background:#bfb;"
| 4
| April 22
| Golden State
| 
| LaMarcus Aldridge (22)
| LaMarcus Aldridge (10)
| Ginobili, Mills (5)
| AT&T Center18,418
| 1–3
|- style="background:#fbb;"
| 5
| April 24
| @ Golden State
| 
| LaMarcus Aldridge (30)
| LaMarcus Aldridge (12)
| Manu Ginobili (7)
| Oracle Arena19,596
| 1–4

Player statistics

Regular season

Playoffs

Transactions

Free agency

Re-signed

Additions

Subtractions

Aftermath

After the end of the 2017-18 season, Leonard asked to be traded. On July 18, 2018, Leonard and Danny Green were traded to the Toronto Raptors, for DeMar DeRozan, Jakob Pöltl, and a first-round draft pick.

This season was the last season that franchise mainstays Tony Parker and Manu Ginóbili played for the Spurs. After 17 years with the team, Parker signed a two-year deal with the Charlotte Hornets and retired after one season. On August 27, 2018, Ginobili announced his retirement after 16 seasons, all with the Spurs. Ginobili was the second-oldest active player in the league at the time of his retirement, behind only the Atlanta Hawks' Vince Carter. This marked the official end of the Spurs' "Big Three" era; the trio of Parker, Ginobili, and Tim Duncan won a total of four NBA championships together during their years with the team.

References

San Antonio Spurs seasons
San Antonio Spurs
San Antonio Spurs
San Antonio Spurs